Sindhari is a tehsil in Barmer district of Rajasthan.

Barmer district
Tehsils of Rajasthan